Pere Marsili (also known as Peter Marsili) was a Dominican friar, chronicler, translator, and royal ambassador during the 13th and 14th centuries. In 1314 King James II of Aragon ordered him to make a Latin adaptation of a now-lost autobiography of James I of Aragon, the Llibre dels feyts. The Catalan language original famously recounted the heroics of James I, known as the "Conqueror," and was a project in which the King himself had reputedly been involved. Marsili completed the four-part work in 1322 and titled it Commentarioum de gestis Regis Jacobi primi or Commentary on the Deeds of King James I (at times called the Liber gestorum or Book of Deeds, in reference to the original). Some historians believe he may also have written other extant works traditionally ascribed to a Pere Martell.

Editions 
 A. Biosca i Bas (ed.), Petrus Marsilii. Opera Omnia: Chronice illustrissimi regis Aragonum domini Iacobi uictorissimi principis, una cum Littera cuidam apostate Ordinis Fratrum Minorum, prius uocato frater Andreas, postea uero, factus Sarracenus, uocabatur Abdalla (= Corpus Christianorum. Continuatio Mediaevalis 273), Turnhout: Brepols Publishers, 2015

External links 
Brief Biography of Pere Marsili (in Catalan)
The Friar Preachers
Chronology of Hispanic translation history

Year of birth unknown
Year of death unknown
Spanish diplomats
Spanish Dominicans
Translators from Catalan
Translators to Latin
14th-century translators
14th-century Latin writers